Gerigk is a German surname. Notable people with the surname include:
 Herbert Gerigk (1905–1996), German musicologist
 Patrick Gerigk (born 1972), American football wide receiver

See also

German-language surnames